5 Forward Delivery Squadron  was an armour recovery and replenishment squadron of the South African Army Armoured Corps. The squadron was responsible for reissuing and moving tanks and heavy armour between bases and operational areas utilising heavy duty flatbed vehicles.

Origin
Tanks suffer mechanical or electrical breakdown and have to be repaired from time to time. Crews would mend problems if they could. The next step would be that tanks squadron's fitters, then the field workshops and finally the Brigades workshops. After the tank had been repaired it could either go back to its unit or could go to the Brigades Forward Delivery Squadron. The FDS was the channel for new or re-worked tanks and for replacement crews.

Command Structure
5 Forward Air Delivery was seconded to the Command of 81 Armoured Brigade.

Insignia

References 

Armoured regiments of South Africa
Military units and formations established in 1972
Military units and formations of South Africa in the Border War